Jan Weeteling (born 18 August 1940) is a retired Dutch swimmer who won a bronze medal in the 4 × 100 m medley relay at the 1962 European Aquatics Championships. He also competed in the 200 m backstroke and 4 × 100 m medley relay at the 1964 Summer Olympics but was eliminated in the preliminaries. He won the silver medal in the 200 m backstroke at the 1963 Summer Universiade.

Bep is the elder brother of the former swimmer Bep Weeteling who also participated in the 1964 Olympics.

References

1940 births
Living people
Dutch male backstroke swimmers
Olympic swimmers of the Netherlands
Swimmers at the 1964 Summer Olympics
Sportspeople from Zaanstad
European Aquatics Championships medalists in swimming
Universiade medalists in swimming
Universiade silver medalists for the Netherlands
Medalists at the 1963 Summer Universiade
20th-century Dutch people
21st-century Dutch people